= Chongqing Times =

Chinese newspaper

- Type: Daily newspaper
- Founded: August 25, 2004
- Ceased publication: January 1, 2019
- Language: Chinese
- Headquarters: Chongqing
- Website: www.cqtimes.cn chongqingtimes.com.cn

The Chongqing Times (Chinese: 重庆时报), also known as Chongqing Shibao, was a Chongqing-based Chinese-language metropolitan newspaper published in China. It is sponsored and supervised by the Chongqing Federation of Trade Unions (重庆市总工会).

Founded on August 25, 2004, Chongqing Times discontinued publication on January 1, 2019, and its electronic version is not accessible.

== History ==
Formerly known as Modern Workers' Daily (现代工人报), Chongqing Times was renamed to its current name in 2004. The newspaper was officially introduced on August 25, 2004. On January 1, 2019, Chongqing Times ceased publication.
